Rewind This! is a 2013 documentary film directed by Josh Johnson about the impact of VHS on the film industry and home video, as well as about collectors of videotapes.

Interviewees
 Atom Egoyan
 Mamoru Oshii
 Frank Henenlotter
 Roy Frumkes
 Charles Band
 Cassandra Peterson
 Jason Eisener
 Lloyd Kaufman
 Drew McWeeny
 Peter Rowe
 David Schmoeller
 Ben Steinbauer

Release
The documentary screened at numerous film festivals around the world, including SXSW Film Festival, Neuchâtel International Fantastic Film Festival, Fantasia International Film Festival, Melbourne International Film Festival, Strasbourg European Fantastic Film Festival, Telluride Horror Show, Sitges Film Festival, Orlando Film Festival, and several others.

Reception
The documentary was received with critical acclaim. On Rotten Tomatoes it has an approval rating of 100% based on reviews from 21 critics. The site's critics consensus read, "An ode to abandoned technology with some admirably wide-ranging insights, Rewind This! is entertaining viewing even for those who didn't live through the VHS era." 
Writing in Twitch Film, J. Hurtado praised the film for being more than just about the collectors, as the filmmakers, "managed to distill the experience down to its most potent ingredients and leave the audience with a highly satisfying straight shot of movie love." Jacob S. Hall named the documentary one of the Top 10 Movies Discovered at SXSW 2013 on Movies.com, writing - "the film finds the perfect mixture of nostalgia and forward thinking, acknowledging the past while taking a bold look at what a world free of physical media will look like." The Hollywood Reporter called the film, "an entertaining, sometimes enlightening history of the video format; though unsurprisingly small-screen friendly, it will be a crowd-pleaser at fests and in niche bookings." A review from the Telluride Horror Show noted: "An unbending passion of cinema appreciation pours excitedly from Johnson's interview subjects, and there is a prevailing sense of humor that permits the subject to never take itself too seriously."

References

External links
 

2013 films
2013 documentary films
American documentary films
Documentary films about films
VHS
2010s English-language films
2010s American films